Montae Russell is an American actor of stage, television and film, best known for his many performances on episodic television, which include his role as Dwight Zadro from the NBC television series ER.

References

External links 

Living people
American male television actors
American male stage actors
American male film actors
African-American male actors
African-American film directors
American film directors
1962 births
21st-century African-American people
20th-century African-American people